"Rich Woman" is a song written by Dorothy LaBostrie and McKinley "Li'l" Millet, who recorded it in 1955, and was most notably recorded by Robert Plant and Alison Krauss on their 2007 album Raising Sand.

Background
The song was first recorded by Li'l Millet and his Creoles, for Specialty Records. He co-wrote the song with LaBostrie, who had previously co-written "Tutti-Frutti" with Little Richard. It was produced by legendary New Orleans producer Robert Blackwell. It was recorded at Cosimo's J&M Studios in September, 1955, and released in November 1955. Backing musicians on the sessions were Edgar Myles (vocals, trombone), McKinley "Li'l" Millet (vocals, bass), Lee Allen (tenor sax), Ernest Mare (guitar), Bartholomew Smith (drums), James Victor Lewis (tenor sax) and Warren Myles (piano).

Cover versions
Canned Heat recorded it for their eponymous first album, in 1967, on Liberty Records.

The Fabulous Thunderbirds included it on their eponymous first album (also known as Girls Go Wild) in 1979, on Chrysalis Records.

Robert Plant & Alison Krauss opened their 2007 album Raising Sand with their version of the song.

Boz Scaggs opened his 2015 album A Fool To Care, with his version on the indie label, 429 Records. His version most closely resembles the Li'l Millet original.

Robert Plant & Alison Krauss version
Country singer Alison Krauss and former Led Zeppelin vocalist Robert Plant included their version on their 2007 duet album Raising Sand; at the suggestion of their noted producer T Bone Burnett. It was also released as a CD single and as a digital download.

It won the 2009 Grammy Award for Best Pop Collaboration with Vocals.

Live performances
Plant & Krauss performed this song along with their first single "Gone, Gone, Gone (Done Moved On)" at the 51st Annual Grammy Awards in 2009. They also performed this song at the JazzFest 2008.

In popular culture
The single was prominently featured in the motion picture, Mad Money, starring Diane Keaton, Katie Holmes and Queen Latifah, as background music, constantly throughout the film, which alternatively ties into the film score.

It can also be heard in the motion picture Sicario, starring Emily Blunt, Benicio del Toro, and Josh Brolin.

Chart performance
The song entered the Billboard Bubbling Under Hot 100 Singles chart at #18 on the week of February 28, 2009. It only stayed on the chart for a week.

References

2008 singles
Robert Plant songs
Alison Krauss songs
Male–female vocal duets
Song recordings produced by T Bone Burnett
Grammy Award for Best Pop Collaboration with Vocals
Songs written by Dorothy LaBostrie
1955 songs
Songs written by Li'l Millet